Donaghy is an Irish surname. Notable people and characters with the name include:

 Kieran Donaghy, Gaelic footballer for Austin Stacks and Kerry, and basketball player
 Bernard Donaghy (died 1953), Northern Irish footballer
 Don Donaghy (1936–2008), American photographer
 Eileen Donaghy (1930–2008), Irish traditional singer
 Frederick Anthony Donaghy (1903–1988), American-born Catholic bishop in China
 Gerard Donaghy (1954–1972), Northern Irish youth killed by British security forces
 Jack Donaghy, a fictional character in 30 Rock
 Judi Donaghy (born 1960), American vocalist, producer and songwriter
 Mal Donaghy (born 1957), Northern Irish footballer
 Mary Donaghy (born 1939), New Zealand Olympic athlete
 Michael Donaghy (1954–2004), American poet and musician
 Plunkett Donaghy, Tyrone Gaelic footballer
 Siobhán Donaghy (born 1984), English singer-songwriter
 Tim Donaghy (born 1967), American basketball referee
 Tom Donaghy, American playwright

See also
Donachie (surname)
Donaghey